Honoret is a surname. Notable people with the surname include:

Edwin Honoret (born 1999), American singer from boy band Prettymuch
Yameiry Infante Honoret (born 1985), Dominican performer